Christopher Michael Anderson (born December 11, 1970) is an American professional golfer.

Anderson was born in West Covina, California. He attended Mt. San Antonio College, a community college in Walnut, California. He turned professional in 1992.

Anderson played on the Canadian Tour (1996–97, 1999–2002), Nationwide Tour (1998, 2004, 2006–09), and PGA Tour (2003, 2005). He won once on the Nationwide Tour at the 2004 SAS Carolina Classic. His best finish on the PGA Tour was T-4 at the 2003 Southern Farm Bureau Classic.

Professional wins (4)

Nationwide Tour wins (1)

Nationwide Tour playoff record (1–1)

Other wins (3)
1997 Two wins on Golden State Tour
2000 Shawnee Open

Results in major championships

Note: The U.S. Open was the only major Anderson played.

CUT = missed the half-way cut
"T" = tied for place

See also
2002 PGA Tour Qualifying School graduates
2004 Nationwide Tour graduates

References

External links

American male golfers
PGA Tour golfers
Korn Ferry Tour graduates
Golfers from California
Golfers from Florida
Sportspeople from West Covina, California
People from Orange County, Florida
1970 births
Living people